Old Gaol may refer to:

Albany Convict Gaol, a prison museum in Western Australia
Buckingham Old Gaol,  a museum in England
Hexham Old Gaol,  a museum in England
Newcastle Gaol Museum, a prison museum in Toodyay, Western Australia
Old Gaol Building (Grahamstown), in Eastern Cape, South Africa
Old Gaol Building (Ingwavuma), in KwaZulu-Natal Province, South Africa
Old Gaol, Roscommon, Ireland
Old Melbourne Gaol, a museum in Australia
Old York Gaol, a National Historic Landmark in Maine, United States
Ottawa Jail Hostel, a hostel in Canada

See also

Gaol
Old Jail (disambiguation)